Cootamundra is a place in New South Wales, Australia. It (or "Coota") may also refer to:

Cootamundra Airport
Cootamundra Annual Classic, a bicycle race
 Cootamundra Bulldogs, or just Cootamundra, a former rugby team in the Group 9 Rugby League
Cootamundra Domestic Training Home for Aboriginal Girls, a former institution for Aboriginal girls, who were taken from their families
Cootamundra railway station
Cootamundra Shire, a former local government area
Cootamundra–Gundagai Regional Council, a local government area
Electoral district of Cootamundra, an electoral district for the New South Wales legislature
HMAS Cootamundra, a former Australian naval vessel

See also
Cootamundra Herald, a newspaper published in Cootamundra
Cootamundra Jazz Band, a jazz band of the 1950s
Cootamundra wattle, a species of acacia tree
Cootamundra West railway station
Cootamundra World War II Fuel Depot